Vitalini is a surname. Notable people with the surname include:

Bonifazio Vitalini ( 1320–after 1388), Italian jurist
Francesco Vitalini (1865–1904), Italian painter and engraver
Pietro Vitalini (born 1967), Italian alpine skier